For Love or Money is a 1963 romantic comedy film distributed by Universal International, produced by Robert Arthur, directed by Michael Gordon, and starring Kirk Douglas, Mitzi Gaynor, and Gig Young. It was written by Larry Markes and Michael Morris, and released on August 7, 1963. The supporting cast features Thelma Ritter, Julie Newmar and William Bendix.

To date, this remains the last film starring Gaynor before her retirement from acting.

Plot
Lawyer Donald Kenneth "Deke" Gentry (Kirk Douglas) is given the task of playing matchmaker for the three daughters of his wealthy client Chloe Brasher (Thelma Ritter).

Cast
 Kirk Douglas as Donald Kenneth "Deke" Gentry
 Mitzi Gaynor as Kate Brasher
 Thelma Ritter as Chloe Brasher
 Gig Young as "Sonny" John Dayton Smith
 Julie Newmar as Bonnie Brasher
 William Bendix as Joe Fogel
 Leslie Parrish as Jan Brasher
 Dick Sargent as Harvey Wofford
 Elizabeth MacRae as Marsha
 William Windom as Sam Travis
 Willard Sage as Orson Roark
 Billy Halop as Elevator Operator

Production
This film is noteworthy for a few reasons. After appearing in a variety of films such as westerns and historical epics, Kirk Douglas was starring in a romantic comedy film, a genre that many people were not used to seeing him in.

Also, Mitzi Gaynor had not appeared in any other film after For Love or Money. She stated that she was "too ordinary for films" and that she would be better off entertaining audiences through different ventures.

Prolific supporting actor William Bendix, extremely popular in the 1940s, only appeared in three more theatrical films after this one.

Douglas' car in this movie is a red 1962 Chrysler 300 Sport Convertible.

Reception
Leslie Parrish was nominated for a Golden Globe as "Most Promising Newcomer - Female" for her performance in this film.

Many people noted that this film was similar to romantic comedies made famous by the classic comedy team of Rock Hudson and Doris Day. Supporting actors like Thelma Ritter and Gig Young, who, starred with Hudson and Day in other films, make an appearance here. Some were fairly critical of Douglas' performance in a romantic comedy film while others were pleasantly surprised by the actor's versatility.

Home media availability 
Universal released this film in 2013 as a stand-alone DVD from the print-on-demand Universal Vault Series. In 2016, it was re-released as part of the Kirk Douglas Centennial Collection, a five-disc set featuring seven other films (Spartacus, Man Without a Star, The Last Sunset, Lonely Are the Brave, The List of Adrian Messenger, The War Wagon, and A Lovely Way to Die). Prior to these official releases by Universal, it was common to find this film in a DVD-r format.

References

External links
 
 
 

1963 romantic comedy films
1963 films
American romantic comedy films
Films scored by Frank De Vol
Films directed by Michael Gordon
Universal Pictures films
1960s English-language films
1960s American films